Nicolas Raemy (born 25 February 1992) is a Swiss handball player for Wacker Thun and the Swiss national team.

He represented Switzerland at the 2020 European Men's Handball Championship.

References

External links

1992 births
Living people
Swiss male handball players
Universiade medalists in handball
Universiade bronze medalists for Switzerland
Medalists at the 2015 Summer Universiade
Sportspeople from the canton of Fribourg